Hot Country Songs and Country Airplay are charts that rank the top-performing country music songs in the United States, published by Billboard magazine.  Hot Country Songs ranks songs based on digital downloads, streaming, and airplay not only from country stations but from stations of all formats, a methodology introduced in 2012.  Country Airplay, which was published for the first time in 2012, is based solely on country radio airplay, a methodology which had previously been used for several decades for Hot Country Songs.

At the start of the year, the number one song on the Hot Country Songs listing was "Cruise" by the duo Florida Georgia Line.  After falling from the top spot at the end of January, the song rebounded to the top in April, beginning a run of 19 consecutive weeks at number one.  Its final total was 24 weeks at the top of the chart, breaking the record which had stood since the 1940s for the most cumulative weeks spent atop one of Billboards country song charts.  This revival of the song's fortunes was due to the late spring release of a remix featuring rapper Nelly, which proved extremely popular on pop music radio.  Thanks to the incorporation into the chart's methodology of airplay data from all radio formats, this support from top 40 radio allowed "Cruise" to hold the top spot throughout the summer.  The remix did not prove as popular on country radio, however, and by the late summer, the song was in the unusual position of topping the Hot Country Songs chart but receiving so few plays on country stations that it did not appear in the 60-position airplay listing at all.

"Cruise"  was followed into the top spot on the Hot Country Songs chart by "That's My Kind of Night" by Luke Bryan, which spent 12 weeks at number one.  Both acts were associated with bro-country, an emerging subgenre which incorporated elements from hip hop music and emphasized lyrics about partying, drinking, and attractive young women.  The dominance of the two songs on Hot Country Songs contributed to most of the chart-toppers on the Country Airplay chart not reaching the top of the other listing.  Of the 31 songs which topped the airplay chart during 2013, only five also topped Hot Country Songs, and on only four occasions during the year was the same song at number one on both charts.  Four acts who topped the airplay listing during the year achieved the first number ones of their careers.  In February Randy Houser gained his first number one with "How Country Feels".  Pistol Annies, a supergroup composed of female singers Miranda Lambert, Ashley Monroe, and Angaleena Presley, reached number one for the first time in June when they were featured on the song "Boys 'Round Here" by Blake Shelton,  Lambert's then-husband.  Brett Eldredge was a first-time chart-topper when "Don't Ya" spent two weeks in the top spot at the end of August.  Finally, the band Parmalee reached number one for the first time when "Carolina" topped the chart in the issue of Billboard dated December 21. Gary Allan scored his first number one in more than eight years when "Every Storm (Runs Out of Rain)" topped both the Hot Country Songs and Country Airplay charts in February.

Chart history

See also
2013 in country music
List of artists who reached number one on the U.S. country chart
List of Top Country Albums number ones of 2013
List of number-one country singles of 2013 (Canada)

References

2013
Number-one country singles
United States Country Singles